College railway station served the city of Glasgow, historically in Lanarkshire, Scotland, from 1871 to 1886 on the Coatbridge Branch.

History 
The station was opened on 1 February 1871 by the North British Railway. It was replaced by Glasgow High Street on 15 March 1886.

References 

Disused railway stations in Glasgow 
Former North British Railway stations
Railway stations in Great Britain opened in 1871
Railway stations in Great Britain closed in 1886
1871 establishments in Scotland
1886 disestablishments in Scotland